Mahatma Gandhi Kashi Vidyapith is a public university located in Varanasi, Uttar Pradesh, India. Established in 10 February 1921 as Kashi Vidyapith and later renamed, it is administered under the state legislature of the government of Uttar Pradesh. It got University status in 1974 as Deemed to be University and State University status in 2009 by The Uttar Pradesh State Universities (Amendment) Act, 2008 (act no. 6 of 2009). The university has more than 400+ affiliated colleges spread over six districts. It is one of the largest state universities in Uttar Pradesh, with hundreds of thousands of students, both rural and urban. It offers a range of professional and academic courses in arts, science, commerce, agriculture science, law, computing and management.

Foundation
Babu Shiv Prasad Gupta and Bhagwan Das established the university in Varanasi, on 10 February 1921, during the non-cooperation movement of the freedom struggle. Originally named Kashi Vidyapith, the university was renamed Mahatma Gandhi Kashi Vidyapith in 1995. It was inaugurated by Mahatma Gandhi.

Kashi Vidyapith was the action field of the Indian National Movement & a pilgrimage for the Socialists.

Inspired by Gandhi's call for self-reliance and swaraj (self-rule), the Kashi Vidyapith was the first modern university organised by Indians in British India. The university, along with contemporaries such as the Jamia Millia Islamia and the Gujarat Vidyapith, were outside the control and support of British authorities, supported and managed entirely by Indian nationalists and educationalists. Attracting young Indians from across the country, its faculty included prominent nationalists and scholars such as Acharya Narendra Dev, Rajendra Prasad, Jivatram Kripalani, Shriprakash and Sampurnanand. Gandhi and Indian nationalists encouraged Indians to boycott British-run institutions in favour of institutions managed entirely by Indians. Many prominent Indian industrialists and politicians provided financial and administrative support to the university.

Bhagwan Das was the first vice-chancellor. Others associated with the first board of management included Mahatma Gandhi, Lala Lajpat Rai, Jamuna Lal Bajaj, Pandit Jawaharlal Nehru, Shiv Prasad Gupta, Acharya Narendra Dev, Krishna Kant Malviya, and Purushottam Das Tandon. The founding ceremony of the Vidyapith reverberated with the recital of Vedic mantras as well as excerpts from the Quran in the presence of educationists, learned persons and nationalists such as Pandit Motilal Nehru, Maulana Mohammed Ali and Maulana Abul Kalam Azad.

Established with the resolution to keep the institution away from government recognition and grants, the Vidyapith was accorded the status of "Deemed University" by the UGC in 1963. This epoch-making event started a new chapter for the institution. Babu Sampurnanand was appointed as the chancellor and Acharya Birbal Singh as vice-chancellor. As the Chief Minister of Uttar Pradesh, Pt. Kamlapati Tripathi initiated a state government resolution to have his alma mater acknowledged as a statutory university; this would occur on 15 January 1974. At this point, Professor Raghukul Tilak was vice-chancellor and the Governor of Uttar Pradesh and would become the chancellor in accordance with the U.P. University Act. At present, the M.G. Kashi Vidyapith is flourishing under the able leadership of its current vice-chancellor, Prof. Anand K. Tyagi

Cultural and political background
Mahatma Gandhi Kashi Vidyapith owes its birth to the educational, cultural and political aspirations of pre-independence India. The early period of this institution pulsated with the national freedom struggle. The teaching provided original dimensions to the concept and movement of Indian socialism. After seeing an educational institution in Japan during a visit in 1913–14, Prasad Gupt was inspired to establish an institution in India, free from government aid or interference. The boycott of government-aided educational institutions during the Non-Cooperation Movement coupled with Mahatma Gandhi's programme of National Education exerted a great deal of influence on Prasad Gupt. As a consequence, the Vidyapith came into being. Students joining Mahatma Gandhi's boycott call took admission in the Vidyapith.Shiv Prasad Gupta established the Har Prasad Smarak Nidhi in memory of his deceased brother, for the operation of the Vidyapith, which subsequently proved to be a fertile nursery for national freedom movement activities.

Administration

The chancellor, the vice chancellor and the members of the executive council, the court and the academic council of the university, constitute a body corporate: Mahatma Gandhi Kashi Vidyapith Varanasi. The university has a perpetual succession and a common seal. It can sue and be sued by its name.

The university is open to all persons irrespective of class or creed, but nothing may require the university to admit, to any course of study, a larger number of students than determined by the ordinances. Similarly nothing can prevent the university from meeting special provisions for admission of students belonging to Scheduled castes or Scheduled Tribes.

The vice-chancellor is a full-time salaried officer who is appointed by the chancellor (the governor of U.P.) from the names submitted to him by a committee constituted in accordance with the provisions of the U.P. State Universities Act 1973.

The departments are under the direct supervision of their appointed directors; each sub-department has a head.

The former head of the Department of Commerce, Prof. Sudhir Kumar Shukla, is a recipient of the prestigious Rajiv Gandhi National Award. He was co-author of a book written by Anurag Chaube, deputy librarian. The award was presented by the Hon'ble President of India for Computer Evam Suchna Prabandh. Prof. Shukla has been felicitated by the Uttar Pradesh Government on account of Hindi Diwas with the coveted university-level prize for his contribution towards the promotion of Hindi as a primary language.

The college declare the result of all courses like BA BSC BCOM MA B.Mus, Bed, LL.B./B.B.A./B.C.A. B.P.Ed./M.P.Ed. M.B.A. M.Lib. MSc every year on its official website.

Dr. Bhagwandas Central Library
Formerly known as Bhagwandas Swadhyaypith, the library was established in 1921 and later renamed the Dr. Bhagwandas Central Library. He was a renowned philosopher and the first vice chancellor of the university. Many stalwarts of the national movement, including Jawaharlal Nehru, Jamunalal Bajaj, Acharya J.B. Kripalani, Puroshottamdas Tandon, Rafi Ahmed Kidwai, Sampurnanand, Lal Bahadur Shastri, and Pandit Kamalapati Tripathi were closely associated with this library. It has a total collection of 2,34,701 volumes of books in humanities, social sciences, and science, and is developing as a centre of modern learning.

Hostels

 Dr. Sampurnanand Research Hostel
 Acharya Narendradev Hostel
 Lal Bahadur Shastri Hostel
 J.K. Women's Hostel

Bharat Mata Mandir

It is a temple situated in university campus, of Bharat Mata. It is heritage place of Kashi. It is attraction of tourists. Temple is made up of marble.

Other campuses
 Dr Vibhuti Narayan Singh Rural Medical Institute, Gangapur Campus, Varanasi
 Mahatma Gandhi Kashi Vidyapith, NTPC Campus, Shaktinagar Sonebhadra
 Bhairav Talab Campus, Birhanpur, Rajatalab, Mgkvp, Birhanpur, Varanasi.

Alumni

Alumni of Mahatma Gandhi Kashi Vidyapith include:
 Naheed Abidi, scholar and writer
 Chandra Shekhar Azad, Indian freedom fighter
 Ramakrishna Hegde, former chief minister of Karnataka
 B. V. Keskar, former Union Minister of India
 Kalraj Mishra, former governor of Rajasthan
 Rajaram, former national vice-president of BSP
 Anant Maral Shastri, freedom fighter, writer and scholar
 Bhola Paswan Shastri, former chief minister of Bihar
 Lal Bahadur Shastri, former prime minister of India
 Tribhuvan Narain Singh, former chief minister of Uttar Pradesh
 Kamlapati Tripathi, former chief minister of Uttar Pradesh
 Nivaan Sen, Indian Actor And Producer 
 Gopi Sonkar, Indian field hockey player

See also
Banaras Hindu University
Gujarat Vidyapith
Rajasthan Vidyapeeth
Sardar Patel University
List of educational institutions in Varanasi

References

External links

 
Universities in Uttar Pradesh
Universities and colleges in Varanasi
Indian independence movement in Uttar Pradesh
Educational institutions established in 1921
1921 establishments in India